Miro (formerly named Democracy Player or DTV) was an audio, video player and Internet television application developed by the Participatory Culture Foundation. It runs on Microsoft Windows, macOS, FreeBSD and Linux and supports most known video file formats. It offers both audio and video, some in HD quality.

The Participatory Culture Foundation no longer develops Miro. The last version (6.0) was released in 2013 and is no longer functioning correctly because of changes to the YouTube API.

Miro is free software, released under the terms of the GPL-2.0-or-later.

Features 
Miro can automatically download videos from RSS-based "channels", manage them and play them. The application is designed to mesh with other Participatory Culture Foundation (PCF) products such as Video Bomb, a social tagging video website, and the Channel Channel, a TV guide for Internet television.

Miro integrates an RSS news aggregator and podcatcher, a BitTorrent client (based on libtorrent), and a media player (VLC media player under Windows, QuickTime under macOS, and xine media player or GStreamer under Linux and FreeBSD). Since 2.0, Miro supports the adding of website bookmarks under the "Sites" category; by default, ClearBits.net is preloaded in Miro as a bookmark.

Examples of supported video files are QuickTime, Windows Media Video (WMV), MPEG, Audio Video Interleave (AVI), XVID as a video player. It also supports RSS BitTorrent. When a new video is available, the program will notify and download if possible.

The Miro Video Converter converts video formats. It is based on FFmpeg with profiles for the Theora (.ogv), .mp4, and WebM video formats supported by various devices.

A developer of Miro wrote that the Windows installer installs proprietary commercial software such as browser add-ons, also known as crapware, stating "This is one of the primary ways we fund continued Miro development."

History
The application was first launched in 2005 as Democracy Player (sometimes abbreviated as DTV) and later on as Miro in 2007. Video searching of web-based video archives was included in 2007, with access to various archives changing over time.

Miro is mostly written in Python, although it links to various libraries written in a variety of languages. Versions through 2.x had an almost entirely HTML/CSS based UI. Miro uses embedded WebKit in a GTK window on Unix/Linux (Mozilla Gecko/XUL until 3.0.2), WebKit in a Cocoa window on macOS, and Mozilla in a XUL window on Windows. Since version 3.0, the macOS port uses Cocoa and others use GTK. The embedded web browser is used only for web pages.

Reception
Miro received a favorable review from Josh Quittner who wrote "I have seen the future of television and it’s an application called Miro."  In May 2011, Seth Rosenblatt of CNET wrote, "Providing one-stop shopping for all your video and audio management desires, open-source and cross-platform Miro deserves much of the praise that's been heaped upon it."  The Softonic review gave the software a score of 9/10, and described the software as "a perfect example of how video content from different sources can be integrated into one single application and served directly to your PC in a fast, easy and elegant way."

See also 

 Broadcatching
 Peercasting
 Popcorn Time, a similar media player
 Open Media Network

References

External links

 
 Democracy Player is dead, long live Miro - last100, 17 July 2007
 CNET 5 Star Review 2009
 CNET Blog article on how to use Miro to automatically download the latest TV shows of your choice
 CNET Video Review of Democracy Player - Dated
 Groklaw interview with Nicholas Reville, February 2008

Internet television software
Free media players
Windows media players
Linux media players
MacOS media players
Free BitTorrent clients
Free software programmed in Python
2006 software
Video software that uses GTK
File sharing software that uses GTK
BitTorrent clients for Linux